The Saginaw cyclecar was built by the Valley Boat & Engine Company of Saginaw, Michigan in 1914.

History 
The Saginaw cyclecar, originally to be called the Faultless,  was a two-seater with a friction transmission and belt drive. The engine was a V-twin-cylinder manufactured by Valley Boat & Engine Company.  Its distinguishing feature was that the headlamps were inset into the front mud guards similar to a Pierce-Arrow. The flowing fenders were built into the body.   The price was $395 which included top, curtains, Stewart-Warner speedometer, tools, tire repair kit and electric horn.

Valley Boat & Engine Company discontinued the Saginaw late in 1914 after an estimated 35 had been built.

External links 

 Saginaw Cyclecar at the Castle Museum

References

 

Defunct motor vehicle manufacturers of the United States
Motor vehicle manufacturers based in Michigan
Defunct manufacturing companies based in Michigan
Cyclecars
Brass Era vehicles
1910s cars
Cars introduced in 1914